Montlaur is a commune in the Aude department in southern France. On 1 January 2019, it was merged into the new commune Val-de-Dagne.

Montlaur village is located in a valley delimited by the Alaric mountain in the North and the Coque hill in the South.

Population

See also
 Corbières AOC
 Communes of the Aude department

References

Former communes of Aude
Aude communes articles needing translation from French Wikipedia
Populated places disestablished in 2019